R. S. Vimal is an Indian filmmaker who works in Malayalam film industry. He made his directorial debut in 2015 with the Malayalam film Ennu Ninte Moideen, for which he received the Filmfare Award for Best Director – Malayalam.

Career

He made documentary films for a Malayalam television channel for a period of time. Prior to making his feature directorial debut, Vimal made a documentary on the same subject, titled Jalam Kondu Murivettaval. He made his directorial debut in 2015 with the Malayalam film Ennu Ninte Moideen, which was based on the real-life story of Moideen and Kanchanamala that took that place in the 1960s in Mukkam, Kozhikode. The film starred Prithviraj Sukumaran and Parvathy. In January 2016, announcement of his second directorial was held at a function in Burj Al Arab, Dubai. The high-budget film titled Mahavir Karna was based on the epic Mahabharata was initially launched as a Malayalam language film with Prithviraj Sukumaran in the lead role. Later in the year, Vimal said that the film's budget estimate is around 300 crore. In 2017, for reasons unknown, Prithviraj opted out of the project and Vikram was signed in as a replacement, thus making the film a Tamil-Hindi bilingual production.

Filmography

Accolades

References

External links
 

Living people
Malayalam film directors
Film directors from Thiruvananthapuram
Year of birth missing (living people)